William Lee Hobbs (May 7, 1893 – January 5, 1945) was a shortstop in Major League Baseball. Nicknamed "Smokey", he played for the Cincinnati Reds.

References

External links

1893 births
1945 deaths
Major League Baseball shortstops
Cincinnati Reds players
Dayton Veterans players
Baseball players from Kentucky